Nostolepis is an extinct genus of acanthodian fish which lived in the Late Silurian (Pridoli) to Middle Devonian (Lochkovian). Members of the genus include Nostolepis gracilis and Nostolepis striata.

References

Acanthodii genera
Silurian acanthodians
Devonian acanthodians
Extinct animals of Europe
Paleozoic life of the Northwest Territories